Donald Eugene Rudolph Sr. (February 21, 1921 – May 25, 2006) was an American soldier who received his country's highest military honor, the Medal of Honor, in World War II.

Biography
He was awarded the medal while serving as a technical sergeant and acting as leader of his platoon on Luzon island in the northern Philippines; his actions took place on February 5, 1945.

While giving first aid to wounded men on the battlefield, Rudolph noticed that his unit was pinned down by Japanese gunfire from a ditch. Crawling to the ditch, using his rifle and grenades to protect himself, he then killed three enemy soldiers concealed there. He then continued to work his way across open ground to a line of pillboxes that were also firing and immobilising his company.

He threw a grenade into the firing slit in the first of the pillboxes, charged toward it  and threw another grenade into the structure, killing the enemy machine gunners and silencing their fire. After ordering several riflemen to cover his advance, he proceeded to attack and neutralise seven further pillboxes in quick succession.

Later, when an enemy tank attacked his platoon, he advanced under covering fire, opened its hatch and dropped a white phosphorus grenade inside, killing the crew and negating its threat. His medal citation concludes that through "his outstanding heroism, superb courage, and leadership, and complete disregard for his own safety, [...] Rudolph cleared a path for an advance which culminated in one of the most decisive victories of the Philippine campaign.".

He was promoted to Second Lieutenant after the battle, and was presented with the medal on August 23, 1945, by President Harry S. Truman. He continued his army career in the reserves until 1963, then worked in the Veterans Administration until his retirement in 1976.

Rudolph died from complications of Alzheimer's disease on May 25, 2006, in Grand Rapids, Minnesota. He is buried at Fort Snelling National Cemetery Minneapolis, Minnesota.

US Highway 7 north from Highway 169 to Bigfork, Minnesota is known as the Donald Rudolph Medal of Honor Scenic Byway. A commemorative site is available several miles up the highway.

See also

List of Medal of Honor recipients
List of Medal of Honor recipients for World War II

Notes

External links

1921 births
2006 deaths
People from Wright County, Minnesota
United States Army personnel of World War II
United States Army Medal of Honor recipients
Neurological disease deaths in Minnesota
Deaths from Alzheimer's disease
United States Army officers
World War II recipients of the Medal of Honor
United States Army reservists
Military personnel from Minnesota